"Delicious Surprise" is a song co-written and recorded by American singer Beth Hart, and recorded on her 1999 album Screamin' for My Supper.

It was later recorded by American country music artist Jo Dee Messina in 2005 as "Delicious Surprise (I Believe It)", and released as the second single from the album Delicious Surprise.  The song reached number 23 on the Billboard Hot Country Songs chart.  The song was written by Hart and Glen Burtnik.

Chart performance (Jo Dee Messina version)

References

1999 songs
2000 singles
2005 singles
Songs written by Beth Hart
Songs written by Glen Burtnik
Jo Dee Messina songs
Song recordings produced by Byron Gallimore
Atlantic Records singles
Curb Records singles